Laura Moser (born August 30, 1977) is an American author and politician who founded the anti-Trump resistance movement Daily Action. She was a candidate for the United States Congress in Texas's 7th congressional district.

Early life and education

Moser was born in Houston, Texas. Her grandfather arrived in Houston in 1942 as a refugee from Nazi Germany. She attended St. John's School and graduated from Amherst College in 1999. She later worked in publishing at the Harvill Press in London before becoming a freelance journalist.

Publications and career
Moser published her first book, an "efficient, compact" biography of the actress Bette Davis, in 2005. With her friend Lauren Mechling, she co-authored a series of young adult novels about the experiences of a girl who moves from Houston to Brooklyn.

Moser has contributed to The New York Times, The Wall Street Journal, Vogue, and The Jewish Daily Forward. She was the education columnist at Slate.

Political involvement
After the 2016 United States presidential election, Moser founded the organization Daily Action. In 2017, she moved back to Texas's 7th congressional district to run for Congress in 2018.

In February 2018, the Democratic Congressional Campaign Committee (DCCC), citing concerns about Moser's electability in the general election, called attention to her past controversial statements. That DCCC action was condemned by DNC chair Tom Perez and Our Revolution, which endorsed Moser a few days later, on March 1, 2018.

In the March 6 Democratic primary, in a seven-candidate field, Moser earned 24.3% of the vote to Lizzie Fletcher's 29.3%.

In the May 22 runoff, Fletcher defeated Moser, 68% to 32%, becoming the Democratic nominee in the general election. 

In the November 6 general election, Fletcher defeated incumbent representative John Culberson by five percentage points (52.5% to 47.5%).

Personal life
Moser is married to Arun Chaudhary, who was President Barack Obama's White House videographer. Her brother is Benjamin Moser, a New York Times Book Review columnist. She has two children. In April 2020, she and her family moved to Berlin, Germany.

References

External links
Official campaign website
Daily Action, activist group founded by Laura Moser

1977 births
Liberalism in the United States
Living people
Texas Democrats
Writers from Texas
People from Houston
Amherst College alumni
St. John's School (Texas) alumni
American activists